Strawberry Park and Strawberry Fields are suburbs in the town of Ellesmere Port, Cheshire West and Chester. They are located to the south of Hope Farm and to the west of Backford Cross.

References

 strawberry park ellesmere port - Google Maps

Areas of Ellesmere Port